A triple deity is a deity with three apparent forms that function as a singular whole. Such deities may sometimes be referred to as threefold, tripled, triplicate, tripartite, triune, triadic, or as a trinity. The number three  has a long history of mythical associations and triple deities are common throughout world mythology. Carl Jung considered the arrangement of deities into triplets an archetype in the history of religion.

In classical religious iconography or mythological art, three separate beings may represent either a triad who typically appear as a group (the Greek Moirai, Charites, and Erinyes; the Norse Norns; or the Irish Morrígan) or a single deity notable for having three aspects (Greek Hecate, Roman Diana).

Origins
Georges Dumézil proposed in his trifunctional hypothesis that ancient Indo-European society conceived of itself as structured around three activities: worship, war, and toil. As social structures developed, particular segments of societies became more closely associated with one of the three fundamental activities. These segments, in turn, became entrenched as three distinct "classes", each one represented by its own god. In 1970, Dumézil proposed that some goddesses represented these three qualities as different aspects or epithets. Interpreting various deities, including the Iranian Anāhitā and the Roman Juno, he identified what were, in his view, examples of this. Dumézil's trifunctional hypothesis proved controversial. Many critics view it as a modern imposition onto Indo-European religion rather than an idea present in the society itself.

Vesna Petreska posits that myths including trinities of female mythical beings from Central and Eastern European cultures may be evidence for an Indo-European belief in trimutive female "spinners" of destiny. However, according to the linguist M. L. West, various female deities and mythological figures in Europe show the influence of pre-Indo-European goddess-worship, and triple female fate divinities, typically "spinners" of destiny, are attested all over Europe and in Bronze Age Anatolia.

Classical antiquity

The Roman goddess Diana was venerated from the late sixth century BC as diva triformis, "three-form goddess", and early on was conflated with the similarly depicted Greek goddess Hekate. Andreas Alföldi interpreted a late Republican numismatic image as Diana "conceived as a threefold unity of the divine huntress, the Moon goddess and the goddess of the nether world, Hekate". This coin shows that the triple goddess cult image still stood in the lucus of Nemi in 43 BC. The Lake of Nemi was Triviae lacus for Virgil (Aeneid 7.516), while Horace called Diana montium custos nemoremque virgo ("keeper of the mountains and virgin of Nemi") and  diva triformis ("three-form goddess"). In his commentary on Virgil, Maurus Servius Honoratus said that the same goddess was called Luna in heaven, Diana on earth, and Proserpina in hell.

Spells and hymns in Greek magical papyri refer to the goddess (called Hecate, Persephone, and Selene, among other names) as "triple-sounding, triple-headed, triple-voiced..., triple-pointed, triple-faced, triple-necked". In one hymn, for instance, the "Three-faced Selene" is simultaneously identified as the three Charites, the three Moirai, and the three Erinyes; she is further addressed by the titles of several goddesses. Translation editor Hans Dieter Betz notes: "The goddess Hekate, identical with Persephone, Selene, Artemis, and the old Babylonian goddess Ereschigal, is one of the deities most often invoked in the papyri."

E. Cobham Brewer's 1894 Dictionary of Phrase & Fable contained the entry, "Hecate: A triple deity, called Phoebe or the Moon in heaven, Diana on the earth, and Hecate or Proserpine in hell," and noted that "Chinese have the triple goddess Pussa". The Roman poet Ovid, through the character of the Greek woman Medea, refers to Hecate as "the triple Goddess"; the earlier Greek poet Hesiod represents her as a threefold goddess, with a share in earth, sea, and starry heavens. Hecate was depicted variously as a single womanly form; as three women back-to-back; as a three-headed woman, sometimes with the heads of animals; or as three upper bodies of women springing from a single lower body ("we see three heads and shoulders and six hands, but the lower part of her body is single, and closely resembles that of the Ephesian Artemis".)

The Olympian demiurgic triad in platonic philosophy was made up of Zeus (considered the Zeus [king of the gods] of the Heavens), Poseidon (Zeus of the seas) and Pluto/Hades (Zeus of the underworld). All were considered to be ultimately a monad; the same Zeus who gave rise to the Titanic demiurgic triad of Helios (the sun when in the sky), Apollo (the sun seen in the world of humankind), and Dionysus (god of mysteries, or the "sun" of the underworld), as in Plato's Phaedrus, concerning the myth of Dionysus and the Titans)

Ancient Celtic cultures

The Matres or Matronae are usually represented as a group of three but sometimes with as many as 27 (3 × 3 × 3) inscriptions. They were associated with motherhood and fertility. Inscriptions to these deities have been found in Gaul, Spain, Italy, the Rhineland and Britain, as their worship was carried by Roman soldiery dating from the mid 1st century to the 3rd century AD. Miranda Green observes that "triplism" reflects a way of "expressing the divine rather than presentation of specific god-types. Triads or triple beings are ubiquitous in the Welsh and Irish mythic imagery" (she gives examples including the Irish battle-furies, Macha, and Brigit). "The religious iconographic repertoire of Gaul and Britain during the Roman period includes a wide range of triple forms: the most common triadic depiction is that of the triple mother goddess" (she lists numerous examples).

In the case of the Irish Brigid it can be ambiguous whether she is a single goddess or three sisters, all named Brigid. The Morrígan also appears sometimes as one being, and at other times as three sisters, as do the three Irish goddesses of sovereignty,  Ériu, Fódla and Banba.

Christianity

Nicene Christians profess "one God in three divine persons" (God the Father, God the Son and God the Holy Ghost). This is not to be understood as a belief in (or worship of) three Gods, nor as a belief that there are three subjectively-perceived "aspects" in one God, both of which the Catholic Church condemns as heresy. The Catholic Church also rejects the notions that God is "composed" of its three persons and that "God" is a genus containing the three persons.

The Gnostic text Trimorphic Protennoia presents a threefold discourse of the three forms of Divine Thought: the Father, the Son, and the Mother (Sophia). Micheus, Michar, and Mnesinous, the three heavenly spirits of baptism, also appear in various Sethian Gnostic texts.

Some Christian saints, especially martyrs, are trios who share a feast day or other remembrance.   Whether they are subject to actual veneration and prayed to for supernatural aid, or simply honored, varies by Christian denomination.

Modalistic Monarchianism

Whereas Nicene Christians professes "one God in three divine persons" (God the Father, God the Son and God the Holy Ghost), Modalism is a form of Christian Unitarianism which stands in opposition to Trinitarianism and holds that the one God is also just one person, but simply appears in three different forms; those forms being the Father, Son, and Spirit. Modalism holds that the same one God simply appears in different forms throughout history. For example, Jesus was simply one form of the same God, and so Modalism holds that the "Father" suffered no less on the cross than did the "Son", as these are simply two names for one deity appearing in different forms. In addition, Modalism holds that the Holy Spirit is not a separate person from the Father either, but is simply a term that describes God in action. Modalism is considered a heresy in orthodox Christianity.

Neopaganism

Peter H. Goodrich interprets the literary figure of Morgan le Fay as a manifestation of a British triple goddess in the medieval romance Sir Gawain and the Green Knight. A modern idea of a triple goddess is central to the new religious movement of Wicca.

See also
 List of deities
 Les Lavandières
 Mythography
 Triglav (mythology)
 Lugh
 Samsin Halmoni
 Thraetaona
 Three hares
 Trichotomy (philosophy)
 Trifunctional hypothesis
 Trita
 Triton
 Tritheism

References

Citations

Additional sources 

 Jung, C. G. "A Psychological Approach to the Dogma of the Trinity" (1948), in Collected Works of C. G. Jung, Princeton University Press 1969, vol. 11,  2nd edition, pp. 107–200.

External links

 
Lists of deities
Mother goddesses
Mythological archetypes